Corydoras mamore is a tropical freshwater fish belonging to the Corydoradinae sub-family of the family Callichthyidae. It originates in inland waters in South America. Corydoras mamore is found in Bolivia.

References

Eschmeyer, W.N. (ed.), 2003. Catalog of fishes. Updated database version of March 2003. Catalog databases as made available to FishBase in March 2003. 

Corydoras
Catfish of South America
Fish of Bolivia
Taxa named by Joachim Knaack
Fish described in 2002